The Rolling Stone Australia Awards are awarded annually in January or February by the Australian edition of Rolling Stone magazine for outstanding contributions to popular culture in the previous year. The awards initially commenced in 2010 and ran until 2015, before being relaunched in March 2021.

Categories

2010-2015 categories
The categories have changed each year. The criteria for the 2010 awards were as per below:
 The Rolling Stone Award: The top honour of the year, awarded for an outstanding contribution to popular culture. The winner of this award can come from any area and is open to Australian/New Zealand candidates only. 
 Best Female: Awarded to an Australian/New Zealand female for outstanding contribution to popular culture.
 Best Male: Awarded to an Australian/New Zealand male for outstanding contribution to popular culture.
 Artist of the Year: The best all round musical artist of the year. This award is open to Australian/New Zealand candidates only. 
 Album of the Year: The best album released in the previous year. This award is open to Australian/New Zealand candidates only.
 Best Live Act: Honouring the best live performance or tour by a band – Australian or international. 
 Artist to Watch: This is an acknowledgement of an outstanding emerging artist. This award is open to Australian/New Zealand candidates only. 
 The International Award: Awarded to an international male, female or group who have had a profound positive impact on popular culture in Australia/New Zealand.
 Mover & Shaker: Awarded to someone who has changed the game in their particular field this year.  The winner of this award can come from any area and is open to Australian/New Zealand candidates only. 
 The Immortal: A lifetime achievement award for outstanding contribution to popular culture. This award is open to Australian/New Zealand candidates only.

2021 categories
The categories for the 2021 were as below:
 Best Record: An album or an EP released by an Australian artist that has notably impacted the musical landscape.
 Best Single: A song, released as a single by an Australian artist that has notably impacted the musical landscape.
 Best New Artist: An Australian artist whose eligible release(s) has broken through into the public consciousness and notably impacted the musical landscape.
 Rolling Stone Global Award: An Australian artist whose eligible release(s) has broken through into the international public consciousness and notably impacted the musical landscape outside of Australia.
 Rolling Stone Reader's Award:

Ceremonies
A list of awards ceremony dates and locations are listed below.

2010
In inaugural awards took place on 20 January 2010, at Oxford Art Factory, Sydney.

2011
The second Rolling Stone Australia Awards took place on 25 January 2011.

{|class="wikitable plainrowheaders"
|-
! scope="col" | Award
! scope="col" | Nominee/ Winner
! scope="col" | Result
|-
|| The Rolling Stone Award || Paul Kelly || 
|-
|| Best Female || Clare Bowditch || 
|-
|| Best Male || David Michod || 
|-
|| Artist of the Year || Angus and Julia Stone || 
|-
|| Album of the Year || Innerspeaker by Tame Impala || 
|-
|| Best Live Act || Leonard Cohen || 
|-
|| Artist to Watch || Boy & Bear || 
|-
|| The International Award || Arcade Fire || 
|-
|| Mover & Shaker || Julian Assange || 
|-
|| The Immortal  || Michael Chugg || 
|-

2012
The third Rolling Stone Australia Awards took place on 25 January 2012

{|class="wikitable plainrowheaders"
|-
! scope="col" | Award
! scope="col" | Nominee/ Winner
! scope="col" | Result
|-
|| The Rolling Stone Award || Cold Chisel || 
|-
|| Best Female || Megan Washington || 
|-
|| Best Male || Gotye || 
|-
|| Album of the Year || Prisoner by The Jezabels || 
|-
|| Best Live Act || Foo Fighters || 
|-
|| Artist to Watch || Kimbra || 
|-
|| The International Best Act || Florence + The Machine || 
|-
|| Mover & Shaker || Penny Wong || 
|-
|| The Immortal  || Molly Meldrum || 
|-

2013
The fourth Rolling Stone Australia Awards took place on 16 January 2013, at Sydney's Beach Road Hotel in Bondi. It was hosted by Tex Perkins.

{|class="wikitable plainrowheaders"
|-
! scope="col" | Award
! scope="col" | Nominee/ Winner
! scope="col" | Result
|-
|| The Rolling Stone Award || Michael Gudinski || 
|-
|rowspan="4"| Album of the Year || Lonerism by Tame Impala || 
|-
| Drinking from the Sun by Hilltop Hoods || 
|-
| I Awake by Sarah Blasko || 
|-
| Spring and Fall by Paul Kelly || 
|-
|| Single of the Year || "Ghosts" by The Presets || 
|-
|rowspan="4"| Music Video of the Year || "Easy Way Out" by Goyte (directed by Darcy Prendergast)|| 
|-
| "I Love It" by Hilltop Hoods || 
|-
| Bertie Blackman || 
|-
| Something for Kate || 
|-
|rowspan="3"| Best Independent Release || Thinking in Textures by Chet Faker || 
|-
| The Rubens || 
|-
| Urthboy || 
|-
|rowspan="3"| Best Live Act || Parkway Drive || 
|-
| Hilltop Hoods || 
|-
| Jezabels || 
|-
|rowspan="3"| Artist to Watch || Alpine || 
|-
| Flume || 
|-
| San Cisco || 
|-

2014
The fifth Rolling Stone Australia Awards took place in February 2014, at Sydney's Beach Road Hotel in Bondi.

{|class="wikitable plainrowheaders"
|-
! scope="col" | Award
! scope="col" | Nominee/ Winner
! scope="col" | Result
|-
|| The Rolling Stone Award || Peter Noble || 
|-
|| Album of the Year || Pure Heroine by Lorde || 
|-
|| Single of the Year || "The End" by The Jezabels || 
|-
|| Music Video of the Year || "Is This How You Feel?" by The Preatures (directed by Alex Ryan)|| 
|-
|| Best Independent Release || Push the Sky Away by Nick Cave & the Bad Seeds || 
|-
|| Best Live Act of the Year|| Tame Impala || 
|-
|| Best New Talent  || Lorde || 
|-
|| International Act of the Year || Arctic Monkeys || 
|-
|| Actor of the Year || Aaron Pedersen for Mystery Road ||

2015
The sixth Rolling Stone Australia Awards took place on 25 February 2015 at Sydney's Fox Studios. It was hosted by Chit Chat Von Loopin Stab.

{|class="wikitable plainrowheaders"
|-
! scope="col" | Award
! scope="col" | Nominee/ Winner
! scope="col" | Result
|-
|| The Rolling Stone Award || Lindy Morrison || 
|-
|| Album of the Year || 1000 Forms of Fear by Sia || 
|-
|| Single of the Year || "Beware the Dog" by The Griswolds || 
|-
|| Music Video of the Year || "High" by Peking Duk featuring Nicole Millar (directed by Jeff Johnson and Max Miller)|| 
|-
|| Best Independent Release || Raw X Infinity by Remi || 
|-
|| Best Live Act of the Year|| The Delta Riggs || 
|-
|| Best New Talent  || Tkay Maidza || 
|-
|| Movie of the Year || The Babadook || 
|-
|| Actor of the Year || Essie Davis for The Babadook || 
|-
|| Milestone Award || Triple J ||

2021
The 2021 ceremony took place on 31 March 2021 at The Argyle, Sydney.

{|class="wikitable plainrowheaders"
|-
! scope="col" | Award
! scope="col" | Nominee/ Winner
! scope="col" | Result
|-
|rowspan="8"| Best Record || Last Year Was Weird, Vol. 2 by Tkay Maidza || 
|-
| I'm Doing It by E^ST || 
|-
| Our Two Skins by Gordi || 
|-
| Brain Candy by Hockey Dad || 
|-
| 14 Steps to a Better You by Lime Cordiale || 
|-
| The Death of Me by Polaris || 
|-
| The Slow Rush by Tame Impala || 
|-
| F*ck Love by The Kid Laroi || 
|-
|rowspan="8"| Best Single || "Pretty Lady" by Tash Sultana || 
|-
| "Meditjin" by Baker Boy || 
|-
| "Low" by Chet Faker || 
|-
| "Life Is a Game of Changing" by DMA's || 
|-
| "miss andry" by flowerkid || 
|-
| "Way Down" by Ocean Alley || 
|-
| "Shook" by Tkay Maidza || 
|-
| "Salina" by Triple One || 
|-
|rowspan="8"| Best New Artist || Mia Rodriguez || 
|-
| E^ST || 
|-
| JK-47|| 
|-
| Jaguar Jonze || 
|-
| Jerome Farah || 
|-
| Miiesha || 
|-
| Stevan || 
|-
| Yours Truly || 
|-
|rowspan="8"| Rolling Stone Global Award || Tame Impala || 
|-
| 5 Seconds of Summer || 
|-
| Keith Urban|| 
|-
| Sia || 
|-
| Tash Sultana || 
|-
| The Kid Laroi || 
|-
| Tones and I || 
|-
| Troye Sivan || 
|-
|rowspan="8"| Rolling Stone Reader's Award || Midnight Oil || 
|-
| Ball Park Music || 
|-
| Lime Cordiale || 
|-
| Sia || 
|-
| Spacey Jane || 
|-
| Tame Impala || 
|-
| The Chats || 
|-
| Megan Washington || 
|-

2022
The 2022 awards ceremony took place on 30 March 2022 at The Argyle, Sydney, NSW. The nominees were revealed on 13 January 2022.

{|class="wikitable plainrowheaders"
|-
! scope="col" | Award
! scope="col" | Nominee/ Winner
! scope="col" | Result
|-
|rowspan="8"| Best Record || Smiling with No Teeth by Genesis Owusu || 
|-
| Cry Forever by Amy Shark  || 
|-
| Gela by Baker Boy || 
|-
| Dreamers Are Waiting by Crowded House || 
|-
| Been Doin' It for a Bit by Ruby Fields ||
|-
| Rehearsal by Skegss || 
|-
| Terra Firma by Tash Sultana|| 
|-
| We Will Always Love You by The Avalanches || 
|-
|rowspan="8"| Best Single || "Baby Steps" by Amy Shark|| 
|-
| "The Angel of 8th Ave." by Gang of Youths|| 
|-
| "We Are the Youth" by Jack River|| 
|-
| "Wild Hearts" by Keith Urban|| 
|-
| "Alive" by Rüfüs Du Sol || 
|-
| "Blueprint" by Slowly Slowly|| 
|-
| "Stay" by The Kid Laroi|| 
|-
| "Fly Away" by Tones and I||
|-
|rowspan="8"| Best New Artist|| King Stingray || 
|-
| Cat & Calmell || 
|-
| Genesis Owusu || 
|-
| Jesswar || 
|-
| Masked Wolf ||
|-
| May-a || 
|-
| Peach PRC || 
|-
| Teenage Dads || 
|-
|rowspan="8"| Rolling Stone Global Award || The Kid Laroi || 
|-
| Hiatus Kaiyote || 
|-
| Keith Urban || 
|-
| Kylie Minogue || 
|-
| Masked Wolf || 
|-
| Pnau || 
|-
| Rüfüs Du Sol || 
|-
| Tones and I || 
|-
|rowspan="8"| Rolling Stone Reader's Award || Gordi || 
|-
| Cxloe || 
|-
| Holy Holy || 
|-
| Jimmy Barnes || 
|-
| Keith Urban || 
|-
| Paul Kelly ||
|-
| Rüfüs Du Sol || 
|-
| Vika & Linda ||
|-

2023
The nominees were revealed on 1 February 2023.

{|class="wikitable plainrowheaders"
|-
! scope="col" | Award
! scope="col" | Nominee/ Winner
! scope="col" | Result
|-
|rowspan="8"| Best Record || 5SOS5 by 5 Seconds of Summer || 
|-
| angel in realtime by Gang of Youths  || 
|-
| Pre Pleasure by Julia Jacklin || 
|-
| Darker Still by Parkway Drive || 
|-
| Here Comes Everybody by Spacey Jane ||
|-
| ReWiggled by The Wiggles || 
|-
| Meanjin by Thelma Plum || 
|-
| In Our Own Sweet Time by Vance Joy || 
|-
|rowspan="8"| Best Single || "Only Wanna Be With You" by Amy Shark || 
|-
| "Ready for the Sky" by Budjerah || 
|-
| "Rae Street" by Courtney Barnett || 
|-
| "Brown Eyes Baby" by Keith Urban || 
|-
| "Growing Up Is _" by Ruel || 
|-
| "Hardlight" by Spacey Jane || 
|-
| "Thousand Miles" by The Kid Laroi || 
|-
| "Clarity" by Vance Joy || 
|-
|rowspan="8"| Best New Artist || Blake Rose || 
|-
| Budjerah || 
|-
| Eliza & The Delusionals || 
|-
| Forest Claudette || 
|-
| James Johnston || 
|-
| Lara D || 
|-
| Merci, Mercy || 
|-
| Teen Jesus and the Jean Teasers || 
|-
|rowspan="11"| Rolling Stone Global Award || Alison Wonderland || 
|-
| Gang Of Youths || 
|-
| Iggy Azalea || 
|-
| Keith Urban || 
|-
| Kylie Minogue || 
|-
| Rüfüs Du Sol || 
|-
| Tash Sultana || 
|-
| The Wiggles || 
|-
| Tones And I || 
|-
| Troye Sivan || 
|-
| Vance Joy || 
|-

References

External links

Rolling Stone
Australian music awards
Awards established in 2010
Australian performing arts awards
2010 establishments in Australia